Eunidia fuscovittata is a species of beetle in the family Cerambycidae. It was described by Stephan von Breuning in 1939. It is known from Kenya, the Ivory Coast, and Uganda.

References

Eunidiini
Beetles described in 1939